Mohamed Kilani Tbib known as Inkman, born in 1990, Tunisia.

A Calligraffiti artist and graphic designer graduated from the High school of sciences and technologies of design in Denden-Tunis.

Very young, he poses poems on paper and expresses his respect for humanity and its attachment to the spirit of tolerance.

Typography and calligraphy are areas that he is passionate about, he explores the possibilities for creating and composing works visually, incorporating messages and poems.

We find in Inkman's works as much the expression of his personal feelings, that a calligraphy work, a composition base of geometric shapes, often bold and intervene on many supports. The Latin characters and poems of the artist mix his roots Arab, his attachment to calligraphic art, as his modern vision of the world and the political social issues at play.

Child of the Arab Spring, the artist chose the calligraffiti as universal language and reconciler.

Artworks

References

 TEDx Talk 2017 L'art des lettres, de l'échec à la méditation | Inkman | TEDxCarthage
 "Kingdom Of Letters" first solo exhibition of INKMAN
 INKMAN- Dubai Street Museum
 Djerbahood "Artworks of Inkman"
 TEDx Talk 2016 Failure as a Power to Start and Succeed | "The Inkman" Mohamed Kilani Tbib | TEDxAPBS
 "Inkman: entre rue et poésie – A MAG". A MAG (in French)

1990 births
Tunisian artists
Living people
People from Tunis
Tunisian graphic designers